Maurice Jackson is an Associate Professor of History and African-American Studies and an Affiliated Professor of Performing Arts (Jazz) at Georgetown University.  He is also a political activist based in Washington, DC.

Career
Jackson teaches Atlantic, African-American History, and the history of Washington, DC at Georgetown University. He also teaches African-American history and Jazz history. He is currently at work on a social, political and cultural history of African Americans in Washington (1790-the present). Jackson earned his BA in Political Economy at Antioch College, his MA in History at Georgetown University and his Ph.D. in History at Georgetown University.

Publications
His book, Let This Voice be Heard: Anthony Benezet, Father of Atlantic Abolitionism was published in 2009 by the University of Pennsylvania Press. He is co-editor with Jacqueline Bacon of African Americans and the Haitian Revolution: Selected Essays and Historical Documents (Routledge, January 2010). "James and Esther Jackson: A Personal Introspective," appears in African American Communists and the Origins of the Modern Civil Rights Movement (Routledge, 2009). His "'Friends of the Negro! Fly with me, The path is open to the sea:' Remembering the Haitian Revolution in the History, Music and Culture of the African American People" in Early American Studies, April 2008, and "The Rise of Abolition" in The Atlantic World, 1450-2000 (Indiana University Press, 2008).

He wrote the liner notes to the Grammy-nominated jazz CD by Charlie Haden and Hank Jones entitled Steal Away: Spirituals, Folks Songs and Hymns (Verve Records, 1995). He wrote the liner notes, as well, to Come Sunday, which was Hank Jones' last recording in the Fall of 2011.

Honors
On April 19, 2009, he was inducted into the Washington, D.C. Hall of Fame, for his years of service to the people of the nation's capital. He was a 2011-12 Fellow at the Woodrow Wilson International Center for Scholars.

Family life
Currently, Jackson and his wife Laura live in Washington, D.C. with their two children.

References

External links

 Official website

Living people
Georgetown University faculty
21st-century American historians
21st-century American male writers
Year of birth missing (living people)
American male non-fiction writers